Are You the Next Big Star? is a 2009 Philippine television reality competition show broadcast by GMA Network. Hosted by Regine Velasquez and Keempee de Leon, it premiered on May 16, 2009 replacing Kakasa Ka Ba Sa Grade 5?. The show concluded on August 23, 2009 with a total of 16 episodes.

The program seeks to discover the best singer in the country through a series of nationwide auditions. The public decides the outcomes of the later stages through text voting. The judges who give critiques of the contestants' performances have included Pops Fernandez, Randy Santiago, Danny Tan, Mon Faustino and Annie Quintos.

The prizes at stake includes one million pesos (P 1,000,000), a condominium unit from Avida, a management contract from GMA Artist Center and a recording contract from GMA Records. There will be two winners in the show: one male and one female.

On August 23, 2009, on the show's big finale, Frencheska Farr and Geoff Taylor were announced as the next female big star and next male big star respectively. Following the third and final round of the competition, Zyrene Parsad and Jay Perillo were eliminated. Camille Cortez and Alex Castro joined Frencheska Farr and Geoff Taylor in the final round of competition.

Frencheska Farr sang the victory song entitled Show Must Go On while Geoff Taylor sang the victory song entitled Heto Na. Both songs were composed by the show's musical director Raul Mitra and his wife Cacai Velasquez.

Production

In 2008, GMA Network had broadcast the country's second version of the Idol franchise, Pinoy Idol, following ABC's Philippine Idol. Debuting to mixed reaction, GMA's senior Vice President for Entertainment Wilma Galvante had stated that GMA had been attempting to work with FremantleMedia to explore options on how the show could be improved to better cater to the Pinoy audience. However, Darling de Jesus, vice president for Music and Variety programs at GMA, later stated that they "wanted [the next season of Pinoy Idol] to be more Pinoy", but could not come to terms with Fremantle over their changes. It was decided that GMA would instead produce their own music competition, tailored to the Filipino audience. This show would be Are You The Next Big Star?

Episode format
The episode format and elimination varies per episode. In most episodes, elimination takes place at the beginning of the episode followed by a group performance fit for the theme. Them the hosts will call on two or three contestants to perform consecutively. After that batch's performances, the hosts will call on two judges to give their assessments and critiques, they will then chose their best performers and worst performers per batch. Before each gap, they will feature bits of video recordings showcasing the week's featured celebrity on the segment, "Big Star Diary." At the end of each episodes, two bottom performers from the girls and the boys are called to be voted by the public.

 In the July 4th episode, Rachel Gabreza and Justin Taylor were eliminated after the performances at the end of the show. Their elimination was solely based on the judges' decision. Alexa Ortega, Shane Tarun, Greggy Santos and Anton Cruz were automatically part of the July 11 elimination, based on the judges' assessment.
 The July 11th episode had a different format, Anton Cruz and Shane Tarun were eliminated at the beginning of the show, their farewell song was considered as their performance song. At the end of the night, the judges announced the bottom group: Alexa Ortega, Christine Allado, Greggy Santos and JP Gonzales. Text voting was opened for the public.
 The July 18th episode and the proceeding followed the July 11th episode, that is, elimination takes place at the beginning of the episode. After all the performances, the judges will tally up their scores and announce the bottom two bound for next weeks elimination following the text votes. Theme was also introduced in this episode; this week's theme was "Songs from 1970's". Each eliminated contestant's farewell song goes with the week's theme.
 July 25 episode's theme: "Michael Jackson tribute".
 August 1 episode's theme: Songs from the 1980s. Since no one from the boys were eliminated during the show, one will surely be eliminated on the next episode.
 In the August 8th episode, Greggy Santos became the last contender eliminated from the show before the Big Finale to be held on August 23.

Big Star Diary
Big Star Diary is a segment were stories of celebrities' struggles before attaining success are featured.

Featured

Richard Gomez - July 11
Allan K. - July 18
Mark Anthony Fernandez - July 25
Manny Pacquiao - August 1
Ogie Alcasid - August 8
Marian Rivera - August 15
Regine Velasquez - August 22

Semi-finals
The top 150 had been divided into two batches. The first batch performed one by one last May 16 while the second performed last May 23. The scores where divided into two parts 80% from the judges and 20% from the jury and the top 40 contenders with the highest scores moves to the second round.

Top 40

Francis Zari Bilon (16 years old)
Richard Del Pilar (22 years old)
Zara Zaldua (17 years old)
Jomar Del Pena (23 years old)
Kristell Llono (16 years old)
Anthony Calvo (20 years old)
Patricia Gerona (16 years old)
Justin Francis (19 years old)
Camille Cortez (19 years old)
Charles Bunyi (22 years old)
Lara Bayani (16 years old)
PJ Gonzales (18 years old)
Frencheska Farr (16 years old)
Noel Sandino (17 years old)
Monique Lualhati (18 years old)
Febz Reyes (18 years old)
Lucky Robles (23 years old)
Denise Concepcion (16 years old)
Jefferson Barte (20 years old)
VJ Caber (23 years old)

Nikki Guevarra (22 years old)
Geoff Taylor (22 years old)
Shane Anja Tarun (16 years old)
Anton Cruz (16 years old)
Alyssa Kate Quijano (16 years old)
Alex Castro (23 years old)
Rachel Gabreza (16 years old)
Marvin Ong (21 years old)
Zyrene Parsad (23 years old)
Loppo Maniquiz (21 years old)
Alexa Ortega (19 years old)
Greggy Santos (22 years old)
Jaynell Calingo (18 years old)
Bobby Solomon (17 years old)
Christine Allado (16 years old)
Aljon Palafox (16 years old)
Thara Therese Jordana (18 years old) (withdrew)
Miguel Orleans (22 years old)
Cara Quiapos (16 years old)
Jay Perillo (20 years old)

Circle of 16
The Circle of 16 was announced last June 13, 2008. This consists of 9 boys and 8 girls.

Male
 Jay Perillo (20 y/o - Tondo, Manila)
 PJ Gonzalez (18 y/o - Pasay)
 Alex Castro (23 y/o - Bulacan)
 Anton Cruz (16 y/o - Quezon City)
 Geoff Taylor (23 y/o - Cagayan Valley)
 Justin Francis (19 y/o - San Francisco, CA)
 Greggy Santos (23 y/o - Quezon City)
 Bobby Solomon (17 y/o - Pasay)

Female
 Camille Cortez (19 y/o - Antipolo)
 Alexa Ortega (19 y/o - Quezon City)
 Cara Quiapos (17 y/o - Batangas)
 Frencheska Farr (16 y/o - Las Piñas)
 Anja Shane Tarun (16 y/o - Isabela Province)
 Rachel Gabreza (16 y/o - Cebu City)
 Zyrene Parsad (23 y/o - Las Piñas)
 Christine Allado (18 y/o - Quezon City)

Song list
BOYS

1. Geoff Taylor
 Umbrella (Rihanna) - July 4
 Perfect (Simple Plan) - July 11
 Love Story (Andy Williams) - July 18
 Beat It (Michael Jackson) - July 25
 Broken Wings (Mr. Mister) - August 1
 Zombie (The Cranberries) - August 8
 Pride (In The Name Of Love) (U2) (performed with Jaya) - August 222
 Open Arms (Journey) (performed with Jet Pangan) - August 232 (Winner)
 What About Love (Heart) (performed with Geneva Cruz) - August 232 (Winner)
 Kahit Kailan (South Border) - August 232 (Winner)

2. Alex Castro
 This Love (Maroon 5) - July 4
 Sabihin Mo Na (Top Suzara) - July 11
 Panakip Butas (Hajji Alejandro) - July 18
 You Are Not Alone (Michael Jackson) - July 25
 Nandito Ako (Ogie Alcasid) - August 1
 Basang-Basa Sa Ulan (Aegis) - August 8
 Narda (Kamikazee) (performed with Gian Magdangal) - August 222
 Huling El Bimbo (Eraserheads) (performed with Ogie Alcasid) - August 232  (Second Place)
 I'll Be There For You (Bon Jovi) (performed with Marc Tupaz of Shamrock) - August 232  (Second Place)
 Awit ng Kabataan (Rivermaya) - August 232  (Second Place)

3. Jay Perillo
 Iris (Goo Goo Dolls) - July 4
 Pagsubok (After Image) - July 11
 Ngayon at Kailanman (Basil Valdez) - July 18
 She's Out of My Life (Michael Jackson) - July 25
 Boys Don't Cry (The Cure) - August 1
 Do I Make You Proud? (Taylor Hicks) - August 8
 Habang May Buhay (After Image) (with Wency Cornejo) - August 222
 Kung Ako'y Iiwan Mo (Basil Valdez) (with Basil Valdez) - August 232  (Third Place)
 Alone (Heart) (with Gian Magdangal) - August 232  (Third Place)

4. Greggy Santos
 Everything (Michael Bublé) - July 4
 Kailan (Eraserheads) - July 11
 Mandy (Barry Manilow) - July 18
 The Girl Is Mine (Michael Jackson) - July 25
 Beauty and Madness (Fra Lippo Lippi) - August 1
 Best I Ever Had (Vertical Horizon) - August 81 (Eliminated)

5. Bobby Solomon
 This Is Me (Demi Lovato feat. Joe Jonas) - July 4
 Imagine (John Lennon) - July 11
 September (Earth, Wind and Fire) - July 18
 Billie Jean (Michael Jackson) - July 251 (Eliminated)

6. PJ Gonzales
 Pangako (Kindred Garden) - July 4
 Always Be My Baby (Mariah Carey, version of David Cook) - July 11
 Nakapagtataka (Rachel Alejandro) - July 181 (Eliminated)

7. Anton Cruz
 I Do (Cherish You) (98 Degrees) - July 4
 Let The Love Begin (Gino Padilla) - July 11 (Eliminated)

8. Justin Francis
 Superstition (Stevie Wonder) - July 4 (Eliminated)

GIRLS

1. Frencheska Farr
 Bukas Na Lang Kita Mamahalin (Lani Misalucha) - July 4
 Please Don't Stop The Music (Rihanna) - July 11
 Bridges (Kevyn Lettau) - July 18
 One Day In Your Life (Michael Jackson) - July 25
 These Dreams (Heart) - August 1
 Candyman (Christina Aguilera) - August 8
 Fighter (Christina Aguilera) (performed with Rachelle Ann Go) - August 152
 I Finally Found Someone (Barbra Streisand and Bryan Adams) (performed with Joey G. of Side A) - August 232 (Winner)
 Because of You (Kelly Clarkson) (performed with Kyla) - August 232 (Winner)
 Queen of the Night (Whitney Houston) - August 232 (Winner)

2. Camille Cortez
 Tulak Ng Bibig (Julianne Tarroja) - July 4
 No Promises (Shayne Ward) - July 11
 Play That Funky Music (Wild Cherry) - July 18
 Rock with You (Michael Jackson) - July 25
 Sweet Child O' Mine (Guns N' Roses) - August 1
 Superstar (The Carpenters) - August 8
 (I Can't Get No) Satisfaction (The Rolling Stones) (performed with Jet Pangan) - August 152
 Bed of Roses (Bon Jovi) (performed with Renz Verano) - August 232  (Second Place)
 Since U Been Gone (Kelly Clarkson) (performed with Julia Clarete) - August 232  (Second Place)
 Dirty Diana (Michael Jackson) - August 232  (Second Place)

3. Zyrene Parsad
 Kailan (Smokey Mountain) - July 4
 Together Again (Janet Jackson) - July 11
 Hot Stuff (Donna Summer) - July 18
 Black or White (Michael Jackson) - July 25
 Dangerous (Roxette) - August 1
 Conga (Miami Sound Machine) - August 8
 Single Ladies (Beyoncé) (performed with Sexbomb Girls) - August 152
 Sino ang Baliw? (Kuh Ledesma) (performed with Kuh Ledesma) - August 232  (Third Place)
 If I Were a Boy (Beyoncé) (performed with Maricris Garcia) - August 232  (Third Place)

4. Alexa Ortega
 Beautiful Girls (JoJo) - July 4
 The Journey (Lea Salonga) - July 11
 Hopelessly Devoted To You (Olivia Newton-John) - July 18
 I'll Be There (The Jackson 5) - July 25
 Material Girl (Madonna) - August 11 (Eliminated)

5. Cara Quiapos
 Fever (Joe Cocker) - July 4
 Girls Just Wanna Have Fun (Cyndi Lauper) - July 11
 Paano (Dulce) - July 18
 Bad (Michael Jackson) - July 251 (Eliminated)

6. Christine Allado
 Infatuation (Christina Aguilera) - July 4
 Narito (Gary Valenciano) - July 11
 Ain't No Mountain High Enough (Marvin Gaye) - July 181 (Eliminated)

7. Shane Tarun
 Dangerously In Love (Beyoncé Knowles) - July 4
 Inside Your Heaven (Carrie Underwood) - July 11 (Eliminated)

8. Rachel Gabreza
 Respect (Aretha Franklin) - July 4 (Eliminated)

1 Contenders did not perform because they were eliminated at the beginning of the show. Their elimination songs served as their final performances.

2 Contenders performed with notable Filipino artists.

Elimination chart

Ratings
According to AGB Nielsen Philippines' Mega Manila household television ratings, the pilot episode of Are You the Next Big Star? earned a 19.3% rating. While the final episode scored a 13.3% rating.

Accolades

References

External links
 

2009 Philippine television series debuts
2009 Philippine television series endings
Filipino-language television shows
GMA Network original programming
Philippine reality television series
Singing talent shows